Sarai Khola is an archaeological site located near Taxila where the Indus Valley Civilization remains have been found.

History
The site was discovered in 1968.

From 1968 to 1973, the department of archaeology conducted excavations in which several terra clay figurines of mother goddesses were discovered. In addition to chest blades and beads, terracotta vessels and trash were also discovered. The most intriguing discovery was the variety of ancient burial practices.

References

Archaeological sites in Punjab, Pakistan